Diron Reynolds (born February 23, 1971) is an American football coach who is currently the defensive line coach at Michigan State University. He has also coached at Stanford University,Oklahoma, Wake Forest, Indiana, as well as the professional level with the Indianapolis Colts, Miami Dolphins, and Minnesota Vikings of the National Football League (NFL).

Coaching career 
After finishing a playing career as a linebacker at Wake Forest, Reynolds began his coaching career at Brookland-Cayce High School in South Carolina as an assistant coach as well as their strength & conditioning coach. He was hired as a graduate assistant at his alma mater Wake Forest in 1997 as a graduate assistant and was promoted to outside linebackers coach in 1999. 

Following Wake Forest head coach Jim Caldwell's departure, Reynolds spent 2001 at Indiana as their defensive tackles coach. He was hired as a defensive quality control coach for the Indianapolis Colts in 2002 under Tony Dungy and reunited with Caldwell, who was the Colts assistant head coach and quarterbacks coach. While with the Colts, he was credited by Dungy with developing Dwight Freeney into a 7× Pro Bowler and a 3× first-team All-Pro. He won his first Super Bowl in his final season in Indianapolis as the Colts defeated the Bears in Super Bowl XLI. He was hired to coach the defensive line for the Miami Dolphins in 2007, and was fired after one season after the Dolphins finished the season 1–15. He was later hired as the assistant defensive line coach for the Minnesota Vikings in 2009, and later as a defensive assistant at Stanford in 2014 working with the defensive line.

Oklahoma 
Reynolds was hired at Oklahoma in 2015 as the program's defensive line coach.

Stanford (second stint) 
Reynolds was named the defensive line coach at Stanford in 2016.

Michigan State 
It was announced on January 25, 2023, that Reynolds had been hired to be Michigan State's new defensive line coach.

References

External links 
 Diron Reynolds on Twitter
 Stanford bio

1971 births
Living people
Sportspeople from Aiken, South Carolina
Players of American football from South Carolina
Coaches of American football from South Carolina
American football linebackers
Wake Forest Demon Deacons football players
High school football coaches in South Carolina
Wake Forest Demon Deacons football coaches
Indiana Hoosiers football coaches
Indianapolis Colts coaches
Miami Dolphins coaches
Minnesota Vikings coaches
Stanford Cardinal football coaches
Oklahoma Sooners football coaches